This article lists political parties in Alberta.

Active parties

Represented parties in the Legislative Assembly of Alberta

Other parties registered with Elections Alberta

Unregistered Parties

Related Federal parties

Historical parties

Parties represented in the Legislature

Parties not represented in the Legislature

Parties represented by elected Senate nominees
 Reform Party of Alberta (1984–2004)

See also
Elections Alberta

Notes

References

 
Parties
Alberta